Moldtelecom is the national telecommunications operator and also the largest telecommunications company in the Republic of Moldova.

On 1 April 1993, following the restructuring of the telecommunications sector in the Republic of Moldova, ‘Moldtelecom’ State-Owned Enterprise was established. On 5 January 1999, the company has been reorganized and became a Joint-Stock Company with the State being the unique founder and stockholder.

During its activity, Moldtelecom has undergone a period of constant improvement and evolution, from a State monopoly to a company willing to cooperate, from a traditional fixed-line telephony to state-of-the-art services. Thus, Moldtelecom is the only company providing the population with the full range of telecommunication services: fixed-line telephony, mobile telephony, Internet, data transport and digital television.

The company now holds a leading position in the fixed-line telephony (6.5%) and broadband Internet access (70.3%) markets. Also, Moldtelecom company has also the largest volume of sales on the market, with a market share of about 57%.

The company's performances are due to the investments of about MDL 700-800 million earmarked on an annual basis for the implementation of new technologies and services, as well as for the ongoing improvement of the relationship with its subscribers. Subscribers justify the effort and expectations of the company, registering, in 2011, a record-breaking number of 1.124 million subscribers. The number of subscribers is constantly increasing, reaching a density of 33% per 100 inhabitants.

History

 1 April 1993 – Moldtelecom State-Owned Enterprise was founded.
 5 January 1999 – Moldtelecom has been reorganized and became a Joint-Stock Company with the State being the unique founder and stockholder.
 2001 – the first Internet service using dial-up technology was launched in the Republic of Moldova. The services ‘VIPcall’, ‘IP-telephony’, ‘Videotelephony’ and ‘Public Video Conferencing’ were launched. The national network of digital fiber optic transmissions and SDH multiplexer was launched.
 2002 - the Cross-Net digital overlay network was expanded, which allowed for the increase in data transport capacity by 1850 channels equivalent to 64 Kb/s. The telephone prefixes have been changed from 8 to 0 at national level and from 10 to 0 at international level, according to international standards.
 2003 - the first stage of the National Numbering Plan was implemented.
 1 November 2004 – the ‘MaxDSL’, broadband Internet, via ADSL technology, was launched.
 September 2005 - all the pre-university institutions in the Republic of Moldova are connected to the global Internet network, under the SALT governmental program.
 December 2005 - The CDMA 2000 1X network was inaugurated and the ‘Amplus’ service was launched.
 2006 – the construction of the network was completed under the CDMA 2000 standard, in the frequency band 450 MHz, intended for the provision of fixed wireless services and mobile services. Also in 2006, Moldtelecom implements the bus network based on DWDM technology, providing the support necessary for any type of traffic throughout the Republic of Moldova and the IP/MPLS overlapping network, serving as a basis for the development of NGN next-generation networks.
 1 March 2007 – mobile services under the brand of Unité, according to CDMA2000 standard was launched.
 16 April 2008 – MaxFiber Internet service, via FTTx technology, was launched.
 2008 – Moldtelecom has been granted the license for the use of radio frequencies and channels in order to provide third-generation 3G mobile cellular electronic communications networks and services.
 2009 - the number of 100,000 subscribers of the MaxDSL and MaxFiber Internet service is exceeded.
 22 February 2010 - IPTV digital television service, with national coverage, was launched.
 17 May 2010 - the public WiFi Internet service was launched.
 1 April 2010 - 3G mobile telephony service was launched.
 7 December 2010 - high definition (HD) digital television was launched, the absolute premiere on the television market of the Republic of Moldova.
 15 June 2011 – interactive services on IPTV digital television were launched, thus revolutionizing the television market in the Republic of Moldova.
 24 July 2017 - the first mobile application "My Account" was launched for terminals with Android and iOS operating system to manage Unite, Internet and/or IPTV accounts.
 2018 - the super offer was launched at Cartela Prepay - free browsing on social networks.

Telecommunications services 
Fixed-line telephony

Moldtelecom’s basic service is fixed-line telephony. The market share of the fixed-line telephony service accounted for 96.5% in the first quarter of 2011 with 1,124,000 subscribers [2].

In 2007, the fixed-line telephony service (Wireless Local Loop - WLL) with the commercial name ‘Amplus’ was launched. The service is based on CDMA technology and uses the standard CDMA2000 1X in the frequency band 450 MHz. The advantage of this technology is that it allows for the use of telephone services even in the regions where connection to traditional telephone network is difficult or even impossible. Amplus telephony provides for services similar to traditional telephony: receiving and making calls, accessing the Internet and many other additional services.

The telegraph service allows for the telegrams to be sent via the telephone, and the recipient will receive the message in the form of a telegram. Video Telephony allows for video communication between two or more persons located both in the territory of the Republic of Moldova (nationally) and abroad (internationally).

Internet
According to the number of subscribers, in the first quarter of 2011, the market share of Moldtelecom company accounted for 70.9% [3]. According to the turnover, the market share of Moldtelecom constituted 76.2%. In 2008, the FTTx fiber optic network began to expand and the ‘MaxFiber’ broadband Internet access service was launched. This service offers symmetrical connections with speeds up to 100 Mbps download and upload, for both local MD-IX and external resources. Initially, the service was available in Chisinau only, but gradually it began to extend to the district centers and large localities.

‘MaxDSL’ is the Internet service offered through ADSL technology. It offers connection at speeds up to 20 Mbps download and upload. MaxDSL service is available in most localities in the Republic of Moldova. In the first quarter of 2011, 169,900 MaxDSL subscribers were registered.

Unité mobile telephony 

In March 2007, Moldtelecom became the third operator of mobile telecommunications services in the Republic of Moldova, with the launch of Unité service. It uses the CDMA2000 technology in the frequency band 450  MHz exclusively on the market and allows for the transmission of voice and data, using the latest technological innovations. At the end of 2008, Unité provided mobile Internet access to the entire country, offering freedom of communication, business and personal relation development, regardless of time and place of residence. Since 21 May 2010 Unité is moving to a new stage of mobile communications development throughout the country and is becoming the largest third-generation network operator in the Republic of Moldova working under UMTS (3G) standard.

IPTV interactive digital television 

On 22 February 2010, Moldtelecom launched the first IPTV interactive digital television service in the Republic of Moldova. The new IPTV service (Internet Protocol TV or IP television) involves the digital transmission of the TV signal through the Internet IP protocols, directly on the TV screen. This new experience in the broadcasting field is transmitted through a broadband connection directly to the customers' TVs, through a Mediabox (Set-Top-Box). The IPTV subscriber can have access to a range of video, voice and data services along with interactive developed tools - either for TV channels or video services on demand.

On 7 December 2010, the high-definition television service was launched for the first time. On 15 June 2011 the interactive services ‘Pause’, ‘Resume’ and ‘Registration’ were launched, which gives subscribers the freedom to choose and control the television content. This meant a new stage in the development of the television market of the Republic of Moldova.

External links
Home page
Internet
IPTV
Internet + IPTV
Unité Voice Plans
Unité Data Plans
Unité Prepay

Telecommunications companies of Moldova
Telecommunications companies established in 1993
1993 establishments in Moldova